The Blonay–Chamby Museum Railway (BC) is a short  steep but adhesion worked metre gauge heritage railway operated as part of the Blonay–Chamby Railway Museum using vintage steam and electric locomotives and rolling stock. It uses the Blonay–Chamby railway line, originally built by the Chemins de fer électriques Veveysans. It is rail-connected at both ends, at its upper terminus, at Chamby Station on the Chemin de Fer Montreux Oberland Bernois line and at the lower end at Blonay station on the Vevey–Les Pléiades railway line line operated by Transports Montreux–Vevey–Riviera.

History and aims 
The Blonay–Chamby Railway and Museum was opened in 1968 with the aims of operating the metre gauge railway line from Blonay to Chamby and in doing so preserving railway equipment of technical or historic value. For this purpose the Blonay–Chamby Railway built two motive power and carriage depots at Chaulin, a short distance from its upper terminus.   They house what is generally regarded as the largest and most representative collection of preservation metre gauge rolling stock in the world.

The museum line 

The Blonay–Chamby Museum Railway is a railway preservation group staffed entirely by volunteers who operate trains each Saturday and Sunday between May and October. Vintage steam and electric hauled trains depart from Blonay and climb slowly through a spectacular environment with fine views over Lake Geneva and the Alps. After reversing at or just before Chamby, the trains terminate at the museum site, where visitors can explore stationary exhibits.

A further part of the remit of the preservation group is the encouragement of local and regional tourism and tourist traffic on adjacent lines. The services from Blonay to Chamby and back are included in the Swiss National Railways Timetable.

The museum collection 
As of autumn 2021 was home to over 70 items of rolling stock, listed below:

Steam locomotives

Steam railway locomotives

Steam tramway locomotives

Electric locomotives, railcars and trams

Locomotives

Railcars

Trams

Passenger coaches

Railway passenger coaches

Tramway passenger coaches

Post and baggage coach

Goods wagons

Diesel locomotives, shunters and maintenance vehicles

Rotary snowplough

Service coach and wagons

Loaned-out rolling stock

Former rolling stock

Abbreviations (selection)

Rolling stock manufacturers 
 BBC :  Brown, Boveri & Cie, Zurich
 CIE :  Compagnie de l'Industrie Électrique, Geneva
 EAG :  Elektrizitätsgesellschaft Alioth, Basel
 MFE :  Maschinenfabrik Esslingen
 MFO :  Maschinenfabrik Oerlikon, Zurich
 MGK :  Maschinenbau-Gesellschaft Karlsruhe
 MTM :  Maquinista Terrestre y Marítima, Barcelona
 O&K :  Orenstein & Koppel, Berlin
 Rat :  Rathgeber, Munich
 SAAS : Société Anonyme des Ateliers de Sécheron, Geneva
 SIG :  Schweizerische Industrie Gesellschaft (Swiss Industrial Company) 
 SLM :  Schweizerische Lokomotiv- und Maschinenfabrik, Winterthur (Swiss Locomotive and Machine Works)
 SACM :  Elsässische Maschinenbau-Gesellschaft Grafenstaden (Grafenstaden Alsatian Engineering Company)
 SEG :  Süddeutsche Eisenbahn-Gesellschaft (South German Railway Company), Darmstadt
 SWS : Schweizerische Wagons- und Aufzügefabrik AG Schlieren-Zürich (Swiss Wagon and Lift company)

Steam locomotive cylinders 
 OC :  Cylinders outside frames
 IC :  Cylinders inside frames

See also
List of heritage railways and funiculars in Switzerland

Literature 
 Sébastien Jarne, Le chemin de fer-musée Blonay-Chamby, tiré à part du livre « Voies étroites de Veveyse et de Gruyère », édition Chemin de fer-musée Blonay-Chamby, Lausanne, éd. 2, 1991, 56 p.
 José Banaudo and Alex Rieben, À la découverte du Chemin de fer-musée Blonay-Chamby, Édition du Cabri, Breil-sur-Roya, 1992, .
 Peter Willen, Lokomotiven und Triebwagen der Schweizer Bahnen, volume 2, Privatbahnen Westschweiz und Wallis. Orell Füssli Verlag, Zürich, 1977, .
 Alain Candellero, Charles-Maurice Emery, Brice Maillard and Nicolas Regamey, 40 ans de musée vivant, Chemin de fer musée Blonay-Chamby 1968–2008, édition Chemin de fer-musée Blonay-Chamby, Lausanne, avril 2008, 32 p.
 Alain Castella and Charles-Maurice Emery: Faire la Voie, Chemin de fer-Musée Blonay-Chamby, Département de la formation, de la jeunesse et de la culture (DFJC) – Service des affaires culturelles (SERAC) of Canton de Vaud, Lausanne, 2010
 Michel Grandguillaume, Gérald Hadorn, Sébastien Jarne, Jean-Louis Rochaix, François Ramstein: Voies étroites de Veveyse et de Gruyère. Bureau vaudois d'addresses (BVA), Lausanne 1984,

References

External links 

 Blonay–Chamby Museum Railway (BC)

Heritage railways in Switzerland
BC
Railway museums in Switzerland
Museums in the canton of Vaud
Transport in the canton of Vaud